Darshademan (also Romanized as Dārshādemān; also known as Dārchādmān) is a village in Razavar Rural District, in the Central District of Kermanshah County, Kermanshah Province, Iran. At the 2006 census, its population was 405, in 86 families.

References 

Populated places in Kermanshah County